Cycling at the 2016 South Asian Games were held in Guwahati, India from 6 – 9 February 2016.

Medalists

Women

Medal table

References

External links
Official website

2016 South Asian Games
Events at the 2016 South Asian Games
Cycle racing in India
2016
South Asian Games
2016 South Asian Games